Gardan Tol may refer to:
 Gardan Tol, Fars
 Gardan Tol, Kohgiluyeh and Boyer-Ahmad